The Royal Order of the Crown of Georgian Kingdom is given to people who have served the Georgian royal family and contributed to the well-being of the Kingdom of Georgia, which disintegrated in 1491. It is available to both Georgian and foreign citizens. 

The Royal Order of the Crown of the Kingdom of Georgia was established on July 4, 2013 by royal decree on the Feast of the Two saint martyrs of Georgia, St. Archil (744) and St. Luarsab (1622).
The current grand master of the order is HRH Crown Prince Nugzar Bagrationi-Gruzinski, heir to the Throne of Georgia.

Ranks of the Order 

The order is granted in six degrees, shown here in order of precedence from lowest to highest:

Knight or Dame of the Royal Order of the Crown of the Georgian Kingdom (KGK/DGK)
Knight Officer or Dame Officer of the Royal Order of the Crown of the Georgian Kingdom (KOGK/DOGK)
Knight Commander or Dame Commander of the Royal Order of the Crown of the Georgian Kingdom (KCGK / DCGK)
Knight Grand Officer or Dame Grand Officer of the Royal Order of the Crown of the Georgian Kingdom (KGOGK / DGOGK)
Knight Grand Cross or Dame Grand Cross of the Royal Order of the Crown of the Georgian Kingdom (KGCGK / DGCGK)
Knight Grand Collar and Dame Grand Collar of the Royal Order of the Crown of the Georgian Kingdom (reserved for the Grand Master of the Order and Heads of State)

Privileges

Titles

The honours of this Order are for the life of the recipient. They are not hereditary. Males who receive the award are entitled to the style of "His Honour", and the title of Raindi (Knight), unless he has another title that has a higher style. Likewise, females who receive the award are entitled to the style of "Her Honour", and the title of Mandilosani (Dame), unless she has another title that has a higher style.

Notable Members

Jean-Paul Carteron (Honorary President and Founder of the International Forum Crans Montana) with the rank of Grand Officer of the Royal Order of the Crown of the Georgian Kingdom.

Dr. Zef Bushati (Embassy of the Republic of Albania in Italy and  Ambassador to the Holy See for the same Republic of Albania).

Grandmaster Nona Gaprindashvili (Georgian chess player). The first woman to be awarded the FIDE title Grandmaster, which occurred in 1978. She was the fifth women's world chess champion (1962–1978).

See also 

Nugzar Petrovich Bagration-Gruzinski

References

External links 

The Royal House of Georgia - Official Site

2013 establishments in Georgia (country)
Dynastic orders
Bagrationi dynasty